The Kocbek Lodge at Korošica is a mountain lodge standing on the Korošica Pasture on the Dleskovec Plateau, below the southern slope of Mount Ojstrica. It is named after Fran Kocbek, an early promoter of mountain hiking in the Kamnik–Savinja Alps. The first lodge, which was built in 1876, burnt in 1881. A year later a new one was built. During World War II, it was captured by the Germans. It was expanded and modified from 1969 to 1973. The lodge was destroyed by a fire on October 20, 2017.

Starting points
 4½h: from the Kamnik Bistrica Lodge (601 m), via Presedljaj Pass
 2h: from Luče via the Podvežak Pasture (1440 m)
 2½h: from Luče, via the Ravne Pasture (1500 m)
 4h: from Rogovilec Inn via the Roban Cirque

Neighbouring lodges 
 4h: to the Domžale Lodge at the Little Pasture (1526 m), via Mount Horse
 3h: to the Kamnik Saddle Lodge (1864 m), via the southern slopes of Mount Planjava
 3½h: to the Klemenšek Cave Lodge at Ojstrica (1208 m), via Škarje Pass

Neighbouring mountains 
 1h: Luče Mount Dedec (2023 m)
 1½h: Ojstrica (2350 m)
 2h: Planjava (2394 m), via the Petkove Njive Pasture
 2½h: Planjava (2394 m), via Luče Mount Baba
 1½h: Big Peak (2110 m)

See also 
 Slovenian Mountain Hiking Trail

References

 Slovenska planinska pot, Planinski vodnik, PZS, 2012, Milenko Arnejšek - Prle, Andraž Poljanec 
 Kamniško-Savinjske Alpe, vodnik, PZS 2004,

External links 
 Description, Route & Photos. Hiking-trail.net.
 Kocbek Lodge on www.psz.si

Mountain huts in Slovenia
Buildings and structures completed in 1882
Kamnik–Savinja Alps